The Championship Stakes, run at Ellerslie Racecourse, is a Group 2 horse race run for three-year-olds at Ellerslie Racecourse in Auckland, New Zealand.

When the New Zealand Derby was moved from December to March in the 2005-06 season, the race was set up to be run on the second Saturday in February as the main-lead-up race, two weeks before the Derby. Before this the race had been restricted to fillies only. 

In 2011 the race was moved New Year's Day, with the Avondale Guineas (previously run in December at Avondale and the main Derby lead-up before 2005) moving to Ellerslie and taking the February date.

Since 2015 the Championship Stakes has been held in April.

The race has been sponsored by:

 Trelawney Stud.
 Valachi Downs.

It is currently raced on the same date as the Easter Handicap.

Notable winners 

The race has been won by a number of New Zealand Derby winners:

 2013  Habibi
 2012 Silent Achiever
 2007 Redoute's Dancer
 2006 Wahid

The 2005 winner Tusker also won the 2006 Awapuni Gold Cup.

Werther, the 2015 winner, went on to win the 2015 Eagle Farm Cup, Hong Kong Derby, the 2016 Audemars Piguet Queen Elizabeth II Cup, the 2017 Hong Kong Gold Cup, the Hong Kong Champions & Chater Cup and Bochk Jockey Club Cup.  It was runner up in the South Australian Derby, Queensland Derby, Hong Kong Classic Mile, Hong Kong Classic Cup, the Longines Hong Kong Cup and the 2018 Hong Kong Gold Cup.

The 2021 winner, Hezashocka, paid $75.90 on the Totalisator. The quinella was $157.30, the trifecta $3,153.20 and the First 4 was $57,607.80

Race results

See also

 Thoroughbred racing in New Zealand

Footnotes

Horse races in New Zealand

ja:サンタアニタハンデキャップ